HMS Walpole (D41) was a W-class destroyer of the Royal Navy.

The ship was built under the 1916–17 programme in the 10th Destroyer order. Walpole was assigned to the 13th Destroyer Flotilla in the Grand Fleet after completion. she was assigned to the 11th Destroyer Flotilla in September 1939 and served until almost the end of the Second World War. Her role was mostly convoy escort duties, but she took part in two combined arms operations (Operations Amsterdam and Jubilee) and the D-day landings (Operation Neptune). She hit a mine on 6 January 1945 and was subsequently declared a constructive total loss and broken up at Thos. W. Ward Grays, Essex in March 1945.

Bibliography
 
 
 
 
 
 
 
 
 
 
 
 
 
 

 

V and W-class destroyers of the Royal Navy
Ships built on the River Wear
1918 ships
World War I destroyers of the United Kingdom
World War II destroyers of the United Kingdom
Maritime incidents in January 1945